The Old Town Historic District is an area located near downtown Harrisonburg, Virginia, that has been added to the National Register of Historic Places. It was added in March 2008. The area covers from northeast of James Madison University up to the area of Woodbine Cemetery.

Plans for the area include upscale and ethnic restaurants in restored historic structures, shops, antiques and boutiques, museums, art galleries, and a cultural arts district.

References

 Press coverage of the announcement
 Official news release as PDF

Historic districts on the National Register of Historic Places in Virginia
Geography of Harrisonburg, Virginia
Tourist attractions in Harrisonburg, Virginia
National Register of Historic Places in Harrisonburg, Virginia